Hyeon Byeong-cheol (born 15 April 1974) is a South Korean cyclist. He competed in the men's sprint at the 1996 Summer Olympics.

References

1974 births
Living people
South Korean male cyclists
Olympic cyclists of South Korea
Cyclists at the 1996 Summer Olympics
Place of birth missing (living people)
Asian Games medalists in cycling
Asian Games silver medalists for South Korea
Asian Games bronze medalists for South Korea
Cyclists at the 1994 Asian Games
Cyclists at the 1998 Asian Games
Cyclists at the 2002 Asian Games
Medalists at the 1994 Asian Games
Medalists at the 1998 Asian Games
Medalists at the 2002 Asian Games
20th-century South Korean people
21st-century South Korean people